The 2003–04 Sri Lankan cricket season featured two Test series with Sri Lanka playing against England and Australia.

Honours
 Premier Trophy – Bloomfield C & AC
 Premier Limited Overs Tournament – Bloomfield Cricket and Athletic Club 
 Most runs – TM Dilshan 1284 @ 51.36 (HS 151)
 Most wickets – M Muralitharan 96 @ 14.40 (BB 7-46)

Test series
Sri Lanka won the 3 match Test series against England 1-0 and also 4 limited overs internationals, one of which was the Bungle in the jungle.  Sri Lanka won the Test series by winning 1 of the 3 matches with 2 drawn:
 1st Test (Galle International Stadium) – match drawn 
 2nd Test (Asgiriya Stadium, Kandy) – match drawn 
 3rd Test (Sinhalese Sports Club Ground, Colombo) – Sri Lanka won by an innings and 215 runs

Australia won the Test series 3-0 after Sri Lankan led in the 1st innings of each match by substantial amounts:
 1st Test @ Galle International Stadium – Australia won by 197 runs
 2nd Test @ Asgiriya Stadium, Kandy – Australia won by 27 runs
 3rd Test @ Sinhalese Sports Club Ground, Colombo – Australia won by 121 runs

External sources
  CricInfo – brief history of Sri Lankan cricket
 CricketArchive – Tournaments in Sri Lanka

Further reading
 Wisden Cricketers' Almanack 2005

Sri Lankan cricket seasons from 2000–01